Maurice Jean Léon Destenay (18 February 1900 – 1 September 1973) was a Belgian liberal politician and burgomaster. Destenay was a teacher and pedagogue and became the founder and director of the monthly magazine Action Libérale. He became alderman and burgomaster (1963–1973) in Liege and a member of parliament (1949–1965) in the district of Liege. Between 1954 and 1958, he was President of the Liberal Party.

References

External links
 Presidents of the Belgian Liberal Party (in Dutch)

1900 births
1973 deaths
People from Saint-Nicolas, Liège
Liberal Party (Belgium) politicians
Party for Freedom and Progress politicians
Belgian Ministers of State
Members of the Chamber of Representatives (Belgium)
Mayors of places in Belgium
Walloon movement activists